Prunicolor, a Latin word meaning plum-coloured, may refer to:
 Amphisbaena prunicolor, Cope, 1885, a worm lizard species in the genus Amphisbaena found in Brazil
 Dicaeoma prunicolor, a synonym for Puccinia purpurea, a plant pathogen that causes rust on sorghum
 Ophiusa prunicolor, a synonym for Ophiusa trapezium, a moth species

See also 
 Austroprunicolor, a word meaning "southern plum-coloured